The Puerto Rico Olympic Committee (COPUR) is the National Olympic Committee for Puerto Rico. It oversees Olympic-sports in Puerto Rico, and selects the Olympic team which represents the island. It was founded by Julio Enrique Monagas, and was officially recognized in 1948.

COPUR operates the Casa Olímpica, its headquarters in Old San Juan.

Teams representing Puerto Rico have participated in every Summer Olympics since 1948. They have also participated at the 1984–2002 and 2018 Winter Olympics.

In 2012, Sara Rosario became the first woman to serve as President of the COPUR. Past presidents include the island's first native Governor, Jesús T. Piñero.

Presidents of the Puerto Rico Olympic Committee 
 Jesús T. Piñero (1948–1952)
 Julio Enrique Monagas (1952–1956)
 Jaime Annexy (1956-1958)
 Julio Enrique Monagas (1958–1965)
 Francisco Bueso (1965–1966)
 Felicio Torregrosa (1966–1973)
 José Enrique Arrarás (1973–1977)
 Germán Rieckehoff (1977–1990)
 Osvaldo L. Gil (1990–1991)
 Héctor Cardona (1991–2008)
 David Bernier (2008–2012)
 Sara Rosario (since 2012)

See also 
 Puerto Rico at the Olympics
 List of flag bearers for Puerto Rico at the Olympics
 Puerto Rico at the Pan American Games
 Emilio Huyke - general secretary from 1964 to 1972

References

External links 
 Official website

National Olympic Committees
 
Sports governing bodies in Puerto Rico
1948 establishments in Puerto Rico
Sports organizations established in 1948